Lielupe Station is a railway station on the Torņakalns – Tukums II Railway in the Lielupe neighbourhood of Jūrmala, Latvia.

References

External links 

Railway stations in Latvia
Railway stations opened in 1913